The Portillo moment was the dramatic declaration of the result for the Enfield Southgate constituency in the 1997 UK general election, at around 3:10 am on 2 May 1997. The Labour candidate Stephen Twigg defeated the sitting MP, Conservative cabinet minister Michael Portillo. The result was perceived as a pivotal indication that the Conservatives would be voted out of office after 18 years, and that New Labour would win the election by a substantial majority.

The late-night declaration of the result became the subject of the question "Were you still up for Portillo?", asking whether a person had remained awake until after 3 am to see or hear the key general election results. "Portillo moment" has become a metaphor for an indication of a sudden and significant change in political fortunes – particularly when a leading MP (especially a Cabinet Minister) has been unseated at a general election.

Background
Michael Portillo was first elected to the House of Commons to represent Enfield Southgate at a by-election in 1984. The constituency included largely suburban areas on the west of the London Borough of Enfield. Portillo retained the seat at the 1987 general election, and won with a comfortable majority of 15,563 in the 1992 general election.

By 1997, Portillo was Secretary of State for Defence in the Conservative government. He had developed a reputation as one of the leading lights of the right wing of the Conservative Party, and was considered a possible candidate to follow John Major as party leader following the 1997 general election. The Labour Party candidate, Stephen Twigg – 30 years old, openly gay, and relatively unknown – was unlikely to be able to overturn Portillo's substantial majority. They had previously met when Portillo addressed Twigg's school during the latter's schooldays.

The Conservatives held a small majority in the House of Commons following the 1992 general election, and remained in power for almost the maximum possible five years as their majority was gradually reduced at successive by-elections. Coming into the 1997 general election, Labour had held a substantial lead in the national polls for a considerable time, but Portillo's seat was still considered "safe". However, a poll in The Observer newspaper on the weekend before the election showed that Portillo held a lead of only three percentage points.

After the polls had closed but before the result was formally announced, Portillo was interviewed live by Jeremy Paxman on BBC Television. By that stage, Portillo was aware of the likely result, although this was unknown to the public, who right up to the result were still expecting Portillo to be the next Tory leader. Portillo struggled to answer Paxman's question, "Are we seeing the end of the Conservative Party as a credible force in British politics?". At the local election HQ, Portillo remarked 'Everyone around me, including the Labour workers, behaved towards me as though I'd been bereaved. They looked apologetic. I know I was a national figure of hate for Labour but you can only hate at a distance. The people in that room were Labour councillors that I'd worked with and liked. All evening, they treated me with courtesy and consideration'.

Twigg and the other candidates also knew the results shortly before the formal announcement. Twigg was shocked, but determined to keep a neutral expression during the announcement to maintain viewers' excitement to the last moment.

The result was read out, showing that Twigg had won 20,570 votes against Portillo's 19,137, and thus had been elected MP.

Aftermath
The result in Enfield Southgate represented a 17.4% swing to Labour. Nationally, Labour won a landslide victory with a parliamentary majority of 179 seats. Other prominent Conservatives to lose their seats included Foreign Secretary Malcolm Rifkind, Trade Secretary Ian Lang, Chief Secretary to the Treasury William Waldegrave, Scottish Secretary Michael Forsyth and former ministers Edwina Currie, Norman Lamont, David Mellor and Neil Hamilton.

Twigg lost his seat to the Conservative David Burrowes in the 2005 general election, but he returned to the House of Commons as MP for the safe Labour seat of Liverpool West Derby in the 2010 general election which he held until standing down in 2019, having served a total of over 17 years in Parliament, almost exactly the same as Portillo's combined service.

After losing Enfield Southgate in 1997, Portillo returned to the House of Commons in 1999, winning the by-election for Kensington and Chelsea following  the death of Alan Clark. He served in the Shadow Cabinet as Deputy Leader and Shadow Chancellor, and stood as a candidate to become leader of the Conservative Party following the 2001 general election. He left the House of Commons at the 2005 general election.

Legacy
In his acceptance speech, Twigg announced "there is no such thing as a no-go area for the Labour Party". Portillo was widely praised for his magnanimous response in his concession speech. Earlier that night, David Mellor lost his seat at Putney, and was seen in a televised argument with the Referendum Party leader, Sir James Goldsmith. Portillo was determined to lose with as much dignity as he could muster.

The public rejection of Portillo came to symbolise the loss of the election, and continues to be referred to as the "Portillo moment". Following  the 1997 election, people asked each other "Were you up for Portillo?", a question echoed in the title of a book published by Brian Cathcart in October 1997, which recounts the story of the election night from the point when polls closed at 10pm on 1 May 1997, entitled "Were You Still Up for Portillo?" Portillo himself commented, thirteen years later, that as a consequence "My name is now synonymous with eating a bucketload of shit in public." Portillo has joked that the moment was voted by Channel 4 viewers and Observer readers as "their third favourite moment of the 20th century", one place ahead of the execution of Romanian President Nicolae Ceaușescu (a Channel 4 list compiled in 1999 puts the Portillo moment third behind the Apollo 11 moon landing and the release of Nelson Mandela, and one place ahead of the death of Diana, Princess of Wales).

The term has become a metaphor for an indication of a sudden and significant change in political fortunes. In 2006, it was feared that changes to the voting legislation, requiring verification of postal votes, could end the chance of a "Portillo moment" by delaying the declaration of results on election night, but in the 2010 general election it was reported that the Conservatives were seeking a "Portillo moment" to unseat the Secretary of State for Schools, later Shadow Chancellor, Ed Balls; in the event, Balls avoided such an ignominious fate, until 2015, when he was unseated from Morley and Outwood in what was the "Portillo moment" of the 2015 election.

Other subsequent examples include former Deputy Prime Minister and former leader of the Liberal Democrats Nick Clegg losing his Sheffield Hallam seat in the 2017 snap General Election, and former First Minister of Scotland and former leader of the SNP Alex Salmond losing Gordon at the same election. At the following 2019 election, the incumbent Liberal Democrat leader Jo Swinson lost her East Dunbartonshire constituency to the SNP.

See also
 Electoral history of Michael Portillo
Enfield Southgate in the 1997 general election

References

English phrases
British political phrases
History of the Conservative Party (UK)
History of the Labour Party (UK)
1997 United Kingdom general election